Alessio Sabbione  (born 12 December 1991) is an Italian footballer who plays as a central defender for  club Alessandria on loan from Triestina.

Club career
On 25 July 2019, he signed a 4-year contract with Bari. On 31 August 2021, he moved to Pordenone on a two-year contract.

On 16 July 2022, Sabbione joined Triestina on a two-year deal. On 26 January 2023, he was loaned to Alessandria.

External links

References

1991 births
Footballers from Genoa
Living people
Italian footballers
Association football defenders
F.S. Sestrese Calcio 1919 players
S.S.D. Sanremese Calcio players
U.S.D. Sestri Levante 1919 players
A.S.G. Nocerina players
A.C. Carpi players
F.C. Crotone players
S.S.C. Bari players
Pordenone Calcio players
U.S. Triestina Calcio 1918 players
U.S. Alessandria Calcio 1912 players
Serie B players
Serie C players
Serie D players